Renzo León García (born August 14, 1990) is a Peruvian rower. He placed 20th in the men's single sculls event at the 2016 Summer Olympics.

References

1990 births
Living people
Peruvian male rowers
Olympic rowers of Peru
Rowers at the 2016 Summer Olympics
Rowers at the 2015 Pan American Games
Pan American Games competitors for Peru